James Eddy may refer to:

 James R. Eddy (born 1931), politician in the American state of Florida
 J. W. Eddy (James Wade Eddy, 1832–1916), American businessman, founder of Arizona Mineral Belt Railroad
 Jim Eddy (1936–2016), American football coach

See also
 Jamie Eddy (born 1972), Canadian ice sledge hockey player